Anastasia Stanislavovna Chirtsova (born 17 February 1990) is a Russian freestyle skier, specializing in ski cross and alpine skier.

Chirtsova competed at the 2014 Winter Olympics for Russia. She finished 21st in the seeding run for the ski cross event. In the first round, she did not finish her heat, failing to advance.

As of September 2015, her best showing at the Freestyle World Championships is 18th, in the 2015 ski cross.

Chirtsova made her Freestyle World Cup debut in December 2011. As of September 2015, her best Freestyle World Cup finish is 9th, at Innichen in 2013–14. Her best Freestyle World Cup overall finish in ski cross is 21st, in 2013–14.

References

1990 births
Living people
Olympic freestyle skiers of Russia
Freestyle skiers at the 2014 Winter Olympics
Freestyle skiers at the 2018 Winter Olympics
Freestyle skiers at the 2022 Winter Olympics
People from Kungur
Russian female alpine skiers
Russian female freestyle skiers
Sportspeople from Perm Krai
20th-century Russian women
21st-century Russian women